The Weissman School of Arts and Sciences (commonly known as Weissman) is the arts and sciences school of Baruch College. Named after George Weissman, former president of Philip Morris, and his wife Mildred, the Weissman School of Arts and Sciences is one of the three schools that comprise Baruch College and offers the Bachelor of Arts degree in various disciplines. While the Zicklin School of Business is the largest school at Baruch College, Weissman offers a majority of the courses in the required core curriculum for undergraduates.

Undergraduate programs

Weissman offers the Bachelor of Arts degree in:
Actuarial Science
Art
Biology/Pre-Medicine
Business Communication (with specializations in Corporate or Graphic Communication)
Economics (BBA option offered by the Zicklin School)
English Literature
History
Journalism (with specializations in Journalism/Creative Writing or Business Journalism)
Liberal Arts and Sciences Ad Hoc Major
Management of Musical Enterprises
Mathematics
Music
Philosophy
Political Science
Psychology
Sociology
Anthropology
Spanish
Statistics

Graduate programs

Weissman also offers several programs leading to a Master's Degree:
Corporate Communication (MA)
Financial Engineering (MS)
Clinical Mental Health Counseling (MA)
Industrial/Organizational Psychology (MS)
Industrial/Organizational Psychology (PhD)

In October 2009, the MS program in Financial Engineering was ranked as one of the top ten in North America by QuantNetwork. In 2022, it was ranked the top program for the third consecutive year.

References

External links

Baruch College
The City University of New York Homepage

Baruch College
Liberal arts colleges at universities in the United States